The PDP-9, the fourth of the five 18-bit minicomputers produced by Digital Equipment Corporation, was introduced in 1966. A total of 445 PDP-9 systems were produced, of which 40 were the compact, low-cost PDP-9/L units.

History
The 18-bit PDP systems preceding the PDP-9 were the PDP-1, PDP-4 and PDP-7. Its successor was the PDP-15.

Hardware
The PDP-9, which was "two metres wide and about 75cm deep," was approximately twice the speed of the PDP-7. It was built using discrete transistors, and had an optional integrated vector graphics terminal.

It was DEC's first microprogrammed machine.

A typical configuration included:
 300 cps Paper Tape Reader
 50 cps Paper Tape Punch
 10 cps Console Teleprinter, Model 33 KSR

Among the improvements of the PDP-9 over its PDP-7 predecessor were:
 the addition of Status flags for reader and punch errors, thus providing added flexibility and for error detection
  an entirely new design for multi-level interrupts, called the Automatic Priority Interrupt (API) option
 a more advanced form of memory management

User/university-based research projects for extending the PDP-9 included:
 a hardware capability for floating point arithmetic, at a time when machines in this price range used software
 a PDP-9 controlled parallel computer

Software
The system came with a single-user Keyboard monitor.  DECsys, provided an interactive, single user, program development environment for Fortran and assembly language programs.

Both FORTRAN II and FORTRAN IV were implemented for the PDP-9.

MUMPS was originally developed on the PDP-7, and ran on several PDP-9s at the Massachusetts General Hospital.

Sales
The PDP-7, of which 120 were sold, was described as "highly successful.".  The PDP-9 sold 445 units. Both had submodels, the PDP-7A and the PDP-9/L, neither of which accounted for a substantial percentage of sales.

See also
 Programmed Data Processor
 PDP-15 - successor to the PDP-9

Notes

References

DEC minicomputers
18-bit computers
Transistorized computers
Computer-related introductions in 1966